Francis George Adeodatus Micallef (17 December 1928 – 3 January 2018) was a Maltese prelate who for twenty-three years served as the Apostolic Vicar of Kuwait.

Biography
Micallef was born in Birkirkara on 17 December 1928 to George and Marianna Micallef. In 1947, he joined the order of Discalced Carmelites, and in 1951, he took his final vows and was professed as a member of the order. On 9 May 1954, Micallef was ordained priest.

After finishing his studies in Rome, he returned to Malta, where he taught moral theology. Once in Malta, he served as the Superior of the Monastery, Master of Novices, and finally as the Provincial Superior of Maltese Discalced Carmelite Province. From 1979-81, he was rector of the Carmelite International College in Rome.

On 5 November 1981, Pope John Paul II appointed Micallef as the third Apostolic Vicar of Kuwait. He was consecrated by the Pope himself on the feast of the Epiphany 1982. On 15 January of the same year, he was officially installed as the Apostolic Vicar of Kuwait and Titular Bishop of Tinis in Proconsulari. Micallef remained in Kuwait City during the 1990 Iraqi invasion, one of the few Westerners to do so.

Last years and death
Bishop Micallef retired on 14 July 2005 and was succeeded by Bishop Camillo Ballin. On 20 October, Bishop Micallef bade farewell to the Vicariate at a special ceremony in the Cathedral of the Holy Family in Kuwait City. Bishop Micallef died on 3 January 2018 in his native Malta.

References

 

1928 births
2018 deaths
20th-century Maltese Roman Catholic priests
Discalced Carmelite bishops
People from Birkirkara
Discalced Carmelites
Maltese expatriates in Kuwait
Roman Catholic bishops in the Middle East